is a Japanese manga series written and illustrated by Hikaru Nakamura. It was serialized in Shueisha's seinen manga magazine Weekly Young Jump from November 2016 to July 2019, before transferring to Ultra Jump starting in September 2019. The series has been collected into eight tankōbon volumes as of December 2022. A live action film adaptation premiered in Japan in December 2022.

Media

Manga
Written and illustrated by Hikaru Nakamura, Black Night Parade was initially serialized in Shueisha's Weekly Young Jump magazine from November 2, 2016, to July 25, 2019. The series continued its publication in Shueisha's Ultra Jump magazine on September 19, 2019. As of December 2022, eight tankōbon volumes have been released.

Volume list

Live-action film
In August 2022, it was announced that the series would be receiving a live action film adaptation, starring Ryo Yoshizawa and Kanna Hashimoto. The film is directed by Yūichi Fukuda, based on a screenplay written by Fukuda and Tetsuo Kamata. It premiered in Japan on December 23, 2022. Eve performed the theme song .

References

External links
  
 

Christmas in anime and manga
Comedy anime and manga
Live-action films based on manga
Manga adapted into films
Seinen manga
Shueisha manga